The Sonni dynasty, Sunni dynasty or Si dynasty was a dynasty of rulers of the Songhai Empire of medieval West Africa. The first ruler of the dynasty, Sunni Ali Kulun probably reigned at the end of the fourteenth century. The last ruler, Sonni Baru, ruled until 1493 when the throne was usurped by the Askiya Muhammad I, the founder of the Askiya dynasty.

Sources
The seventeenth century chronicles, the Tarikh al-Sudan and the Tarikh al-fattash describe the history of the Songhay people and provide lists of their rulers. The Tarikh al-Sudan gives a list of the earlier rulers of the Za dynasty whose mythical founder Za Alayaman lived before the 10th century and the arrival of Islam. Both chronicles provide details on Ali Kulun (or Ali Golom) the founder of the Sunni dynasty. He revolted against the hegemony of the Mali Empire. A date is not given in the chronicles but the comment in the Tarikh al-fattash that the fifth ruler was in power at time when Mansa Musa made his pilgrimage suggests that Ali Kulun reigned around the end of the 14th century.

Both chronicles associate Ali Kulun (or Ali Golom) with the Mali court. The Tarikh al-Sudan relates that his father was Za Yasoboy, and as a son of a subordinate ruler of the Mali Empire, he had to serve the sultan of Mali.

The chronicles do not specify where the early rulers lived. As there is evidence that Gao remained under Mali control until the early fifteenth century, it is probably that the early Sunni rulers controlled a region to the south, with the town of Kukiya possibly serving as their capital. As the economic strength of Mali Empire relied on controlling routes across the Sahara, it would not have been necessary to control the area to the south of Gao.

Al-Sadi, the author of the Tarikh al-Sudan uses the word Sunni or Sonni for the name of the dynasty while the Tarikh al-fattash uses the forms chi and si'i. The word may have a Malinke origin meaning "a subordinate or confidant of the ruler".

Under the rule of Sunni Sulayman, the Songhai captured the Mema region to the west of Lake Débo. His successor, Sunni Ali, greatly expanded the territory under Sunni control. The dynasty ended in April 1493 when Sunni Bakr Dao was defeated in battle against Askiya Muhammad I.

The two chronicles agree on the first and last rulers of the dynasty but differ on the number and order of the intervening rulers.

Rulers according to the Tarikh al-Sudan
The names with their diacritics listed below are those given in the translation of the Tarikh al-Sudan from Arabic into English by John Hunwick. The surviving Arabic manuscripts differ both in the spelling and the vocalization of the names. This may be partly due to the difficulty of representing Songhay (or proto-Songhay) sounds in Arabic and perhaps also due to different Songhay dialects. Not all the names are listed in all the surviving manuscripts.

Sunni ʿAlī Kulun (probably ruled early in the 14th century)
Sunni Silman Nāri (brother of ʿAlī Kulun) 
Sunni Ibrāhīm Kabay
Sunni ʿUthmān Kanafa
Sunni Bār Kayna Ankabī
Sunni Mūsā
Sunni Bukar Zunku
Sunni Bukar Dala Buyunbu
Sunni Mār Kiray
Sunni Muḥammad Dao
Sunni Muḥammad Kūkiyā
Sunni Muḥammad Fār
Sunni K.r.bīf
Sunni Mār Fī Kuli Jim
Sunni Mār Ar Kayna
Sunni Mār Aranda
Sunni Sulaymān
Sunni ʿAlī (ruled 1464-1492)
Sunni Bāru or Bukar Dāo (ruled 1492-1493)

Rulers according to the Tarikh al-fattash
The names with their diacritics listed below are those given in the translation of Tarikh al-fattash from the Arabic into French by Octave Houdas.

Sunni Ali-Golom (revolted from Mali c. 1275 during the reign of Mansa Khalifa)
Sunni Silman-Nâri
Sunni Ibrâhîm-Kabayao
Sunni Ousmân-Guifo
Sunni Mâkara-Komsoû (on throne in 1321-1322)
Sunni Boubakar-Katiya
Sunni Ankada Doukourou
Sunni Kimi-Yankoï-Moûssa
Sunni Bâro-Dal-Yomho
Sunni Mâdao
Sunni Mohammed Koûkiya
Sunni Mohammed-Fâri
Sunni Balam
Sunni Souleïmân-Dâma
Sunni Ali (ruled 1464-1492)
Sunni Bâro (ruled 1492-1493)

See also
 Za dynasty
 Askia dynasty
 Mali Empire
 Songhai Empire

Notes

References
.
. Also available from Aluka but requires subscription.
.

Songhai Empire